Ochthera is a genus of flies in the family of shore flies (Ephydridae). The genus is distinctive because of the swollen raptorial forelegs. The larvae are predaceous on midge larvae while the adults feed on midges and mosquitoes. The genus is found around the world with about 37 species. The species Ochthera chalybescens  has been shown to prey on African malaria vectors .

Behaviour
It has been noted that foreleg waving may be involved in displays and UV reflective patches on the face and fore coxae may be involved.

Spreading and waving of the foreleg is involved in same sex encounters as well as with male and female pairs during approach. It is not known if it is a threat or a recognition display. Adult Ochthera mantis have been noted to probe sand with their proboscis and when they detect prey such as chirononomid larvae, they are excavated using the fore tibial spines and held between the tibia and femora as the prey is consumed.

All species in the genus are predaceous.

Species
These 55 species belong to the genus Ochthera:

Ochthera acta Clausen, 1977
Ochthera anatolikos Clausen, 1977
Ochthera angustifacies (Hendel, 1930)
Ochthera angustitarsus Becker, 1903
Ochthera argyrata Wirth, 1955
Ochthera baia Cresson, 1931
Ochthera borealis Clausen, 1977
Ochthera brevitivialis Meijere, 1908
Ochthera caeruleovittata Hendel, 1930
Ochthera canescens Cresson, 1931
Ochthera canzonerii Raffone, 2002
Ochthera chalybescens Loew, 1862
Ochthera circularis Cresson, 1926
Ochthera clauseni Raffone, 2002
Ochthera collina Clausen, 1977
Ochthera cressoni Giordani Soika, 1956
Ochthera cuprilineata Wheeler, 1896
Ochthera dasylenos Clausen, 1977
Ochthera exsculpta Loew, 1862
Ochthera friderichsi Enderlein, 1922
Ochthera guangdongensis Zhang & Yang, 2006
Ochthera hainanensis Zhang & Yang, 2006
Ochthera harpax Meijere, 1911
Ochthera humilis Williston, 1896
Ochthera innotata Walker, 1860
Ochthera insularis Becker, 1910
Ochthera japonica Clausen, 1977
Ochthera jos Cresson, 1939
Ochthera lauta Wheeler, 1896
Ochthera loreta Cresson, 1931
Ochthera macrothrix Clasuen, 1977
Ochthera manicata (Fabricius, 1794)
Ochthera mantis (De Geer, 1776)
Ochthera mantispa Loew, 1847
Ochthera margarita Cresson, 1932
Ochthera nigricoxa (Cresson, 1938)
Ochthera nigripes (Enderlein, 1922)
Ochthera occidentalis Clausen, 1977
Ochthera painteri Cresson, 1931
Ochthera palaearctica Clausen, 1977
Ochthera palearctica Clausen, 1977
Ochthera pilimana Becker, 1903
Ochthera pilosa Cresson, 1926
Ochthera praedatoria Loew, 1862
Ochthera regalis Williston, 1897
Ochthera rossii Raffone, 2002
Ochthera rotunda Schiner, 1868
Ochthera sauteri Cresson, 1932
Ochthera schembrii Rondani, 1847
Ochthera setigera Czerny, 1909
Ochthera speculifera (Enderlein, 1922)
Ochthera subtilis Adams, 1905
Ochthera triornata Cresson, 1926
Ochthera tuberculata Loew, 1862
Ochthera wrighti Cresson, 1931

References

Ephydridae
Ephydroidea genera
Taxa named by Pierre André Latreille
Diptera of North America
Diptera of South America
Diptera of Asia
Diptera of Europe
Diptera of Africa